Diane Kiyomi Mizota (born September 9, 1973) is an American dancer, actress, and TV personality.

Early life
Diane Mizota, a Japanese American, was born in Los Angeles, California and raised in Danville, California. She studied dance in high school and in UCLA and graduated summa cum laude with a degree in Communication Studies.

Filmography

Film

Television

External links
 Diane Mizota's website

1973 births
Actresses from Los Angeles
American actresses of Japanese descent
American film actors of Asian descent
American female dancers
American film actresses
American television actresses
Dancers from California
Living people
Television personalities from California
20th-century American actresses
20th-century American dancers
21st-century American actresses
21st-century American dancers
American dancers of Asian descent